Transport and Communications Committee may refer to:
Transport and Communications Committee (Iceland)
Transport and Communications Committee (Sweden)

See also 
Standing Committee on Transport and Communications, Norway